Substitute Teacher is a 1975 Italian commedia sexy all'italiana film directed by . The film was a box office success and launched the brief film career of the singer Carmen Villani.

Plot

Cast 
Carmen Villani as Loredana
Carlo Giuffré as Tarzanic 
Dayle Haddon as Sonia
 Eligio Zamara as Stefano 
Gisela Hahn as Gym Teacher
 Alvaro Brunetti as Sergio
 Giusi Raspani Dandolo as Professor Teresa Scifuni
Giacomo Furia as Director
 Gastone Pescucci as Janitor
Tom Felleghy  as Professor 
Ilona Staller as Student 
Gloria Piedimonte as Student  
Attilio Dottesio as Priest

See also      
 List of Italian films of 1975

References

External links

Substitute Teacher at Variety Distribution

1975 films
1970s sex comedy films
Films directed by Guido Leoni
Commedia sexy all'italiana
Italian high school films
1975 comedy films
1970s Italian-language films
1970s Italian films